Primera Fila ("Front Row") is the title of a live album released by Mexican performer Vicente Fernández. This album is the 80th release by the performer, and became his third number-one set on the Billboard Top Latin Albums and the recipient of a Latin Grammy Award for Best Ranchero Album.

Album history
After the success of Para Siempre, releases this album, which includes his greatest hits recorded live, with the participation of 30 musicians, in the "Vicente Fernández Gómez Arena". This unplugged CD and DVD also contains four songs never recorded before by Fernández: "Bésame Mucho", "Amor Mío", "No Vuelvo a Amar" and "Gracias". According to the record label Sony BMG, this is a live performance dedicated to the families, to see it in high definition and to be close to the idol. Primera Fila is the 80th album by the singer.

Commercial release

Formats
This album was released in three different formats, CD/DVD and DVD/CD, and also in "Blu-ray", this last format as a collectors item. It was recorded in a "anti-pirate" system and in High definition, and in a near future will be released on 3D, to give the best quality for the fans, according to Miguel Trujillo, CEO of Sony Music México.

Album
A day after its release, Primera Fila it sold 80,000 units in México, receiving a platinum certification. In the United States, according to the Billboard Top Latin Albums chart it debuted at number one, replacing 5to Piso by Guatemalan singer-songwriter Ricardo Arjona. In February 2009, this album was replaced by Para Siempre, Fernández' previous album, at the top of the Billboard Top Latin Albums chart, after seven consecutive weeks at number-one. The late Tex-Mex performer Selena was the only performer to achieve this feat, when Dreaming of You replaced her own Amor Prohibido at the top of the chart in 1995.

Singles
The first single released from this album is "El Ultimo Beso", written by Joan Sebastian and first included on Para Siempre. This song became the first number-one hit by Fernández in the Billboard Hot Latin Songs chart and became the oldest performer to peak at number-one on this chart.

Track listing

Personnel
This information from Allmusic.
Gustavo Borner – didjeridu, engineer, mastering, realization
Pedro Ramírez – arranger, musical direction
Josué "Ciclón" García – production assistant
Juan Carlos Rodríguez – production assistant
Justin Moshkevich – digital engineer
Charlie Garcia – A&R
Gilda Oropeza – A&R
Miguel Trujillo – A&R
Fernando Aceves – photography

Charts

Weekly charts

Year-end charts

Sales and certifications

See also
 List of number-one albums of 2009 (Mexico)
 List of number-one Billboard Top Latin Albums of 2008
 List of number-one Billboard Top Latin Albums of 2009

References

2008 live albums
Latin Grammy Award for Best Ranchero/Mariachi Album
Primera Fila albums
Sony Music Latin live albums
Spanish-language live albums
Vicente Fernández live albums